Langhorne Burton (25 December 1880 – 6 December 1949) was a British film actor.

Filmography
 Liberty Hall (1914)
 The King's Minister (1914)
 Bootle's Baby (1914)
 The Difficult Way (1914)
 The Treasure of Heaven (1916)
 The Profligate (1917)
 Daddy (1917) - John Melsher
 Auld Robin Gray (1917)
 Tom Jones (1917)
 God and the Man (1918) - Christiansen
 The Impossible Woman (1919)
 Sweet and Twenty (1919)
 The Amateur Gentleman (1920) - Barnabas Barty
 Little Dorrit (1920)
 The Children of Gibeon (1920)
 Two Little Wooden Shoes (1920)
 A Man's Shadow (1920)
 By Berwin Banks (1920)
 The Temptress (1920)
 At the Villa Rose (1920)
 Appearances (1921) - Sir William Rutherford
 Moth and Rust (1921)
 The Bonnie Brier Bush (1921) - John Carmichael
 Who Is the Man? (1924) - Albert Arnault
 Marriage License? (1926)
 The City of a Thousand Delights (1927)
 Cross Roads (1930)

References

External links
 

1880 births
1949 deaths
English male film actors
English male silent film actors
People from East Lindsey District
20th-century English male actors